The Tunduru Gardens is public park and garden in downtown Maputo, Mozambique. It was designed in 1885 by British gardener Thomas Honney. It is home to tennis courts owned by the Mozambique Tennis Federation.

References

Parks in Mozambique
Geography of Maputo
Urban public parks
Sport in Mozambique
Sport in Maputo
Tourist attractions in Maputo